Chauliognathus tricolor, the Tricolor soldier beetle, is a species of soldier beetle in the family Cantharidae. It has a flattened body between 6 and 16 millimeters long with a prominent red-orange stripe behind the black prothorax. The abdomen is yellow-orange but is mostly obscured by the metallic olive green elytra.

Distribution
It is found in Eastern Australia and Tasmania.

References

Further reading

External links

 

Cantharidae
Beetles described in 1840